Straža is a small settlement above Rafolče in the Municipality of Lukovica in the eastern part of the Upper Carniola region of Slovenia.

References

External links
Straža on Geopedia

Populated places in the Municipality of Lukovica